The Lady from the Sea is a 1961 drama one-off presented on Australian broadcaster ABC. An adaptation of 1888 play by Norwegian playwright Henrik Ibsen, it went for 75 minutes and was telecast live on 4 October 1961 in Melbourne, and was recorded for showing in Sydney (it is not known if it was also shown on ABC's stations in Adelaide, Brisbane and Perth).

Per a search of their website, the National Archives may hold a copy, with running time listed as 1:23:12.

Australian TV drama was relatively rare at the time.

Plot
A young woman, Eldsa, is married but still carries a torch for a former lover, who she believes is drowned. The husband believes another man was also his wife's former lover. A young consumptive man seems to be interested in the wife, but actually wants her daughter. The former lover emerges from the sea.

Cast
Lynne Flanagan as Eldsa
Edward Howell as Dr Wangel
Carole Potter as Bolette
Eva Freitag as Hilde
Roland Redshaw as Arnholm
David Mitchell as Lyngstrand
Wynn Roberts as the stranger
Campbell Copelin as Ballested
Nancy Cato

Production

The play had been performed on Australian radio in February 1959.

It was the first TV production for Lynne Flanagan and 14 year old Eva Freitag.

Reception
The Australian Woman's Weekly TV critic said "The whole thing really had to be seen to be believed. There was so much talk of the sea, people drowning, so much trick photography that didn't come off, that I ended up feeling like a sea creature myself."

References

External links

1961 television films
1961 films
Australian television films
Australian Broadcasting Corporation original programming
English-language television shows
Black-and-white Australian television shows
Australian live television shows
Films based on works by Henrik Ibsen
Films directed by William Sterling (director)